Kilmainhamwood, historically simply Killmainham, is a village and townland in north County Meath, Ireland. The village is built on the River Dee and is situated north of Whitewood Lake. The village is located on local roads. Neighbouring parishes are Kingscourt to the north, Drumconrath to the east, Nobber to the south-east, Moynalty to the south and Bailieborough to the west.

Amenities
There is a primary school, a church, two pubs, and a newsagent near the centre of the village.

Kilmainham Wood station on the former Dublin to Kingscourt railway line was situated east of the village and was closed to passengers in 1947.

Sport
The local Gaelic football club is called Kilmainhamwood GFC. The club won the Meath Senior Football Championship once in 1996, however, they now compete in the Junior A Football Championship, which they have won three times in 1965, 1982 and most recently in 1994. Nobber is Kilmainhamwood's main football rivals. Notable former players for Kilmainhamwood include Brian Stafford, Sean McCormack and Jerry Owens.

People
 Brian Stafford, former Meath Gaelic footballer lives in Kilmainhamwood.
 Colm Gilcreest, former professional snooker player is from Cormeen, Kilmainhamwood.

See also
List of towns and villages in Ireland
All-Ireland Senior Club Football Championship 2010-2011

References

Towns and villages in County Meath
Articles on towns and villages in Ireland possibly missing Irish place names
Geography of County Meath